The Comptroller of the Treasury of Tennessee is an office established by Chapter 12 of the Public Acts of 1835-36 of Tennessee's General Assembly. Later, in 1870, the position of Comptroller became mandatory by the state constitution. The office has 12 divisions and employs over 560 people. The office's mission to the make government work better. The current Comptroller of the Treasury is Jason Mumpower.

Duties 
The Comptroller's duties are governed by statute. The office is responsible for upholding the financial integrity of the state and local governments. It is also to ensure that taxes are properly accounted for and that proceeds are spent as authorized by the Tennessee General Assembly.

In history

List of past comptrollers of the treasury 
The first and only female to hold the office of Comptroller of Treasury is Jeanne Bodfish, serving from 1953 to 1955.

William Snodgrass held the office of Comptroller of Treasury the longest, serving for 22 consecutive two-year terms from 1955 to 1999.

The following have held the office of Comptroller of the Treasury in Tennessee:

 Daniel Graham, 1836—1843
 Felix Zollicoffer, 1843—1849
 B.H. Sheppard, 1849—1851
 Arthur Crozier, 1851—1855
 James Luttrell, 1855—1857
 James Dunlap, 1857—1861
 Joseph Fowler, 1862—1865
 S.E. Hackett, 1865—1866
 G.W. Blackburn, 1866—1870
 E.R. Pennebaker, 1870—1873
 W.W. Hobbs, 1873
 John Burch, 1873—1875
 James Gaines, 1875—1881
 James Nolan, 1881—1883
 P.P. Pickard, 1883—1889
 J.W. Allen, 1889—1893
 James Harris, 1893—1899
 Theo King, 1899—1904
 Frank Dibrell, 1904—1913
 George Woollen, 1913—1915
 J.B. Thompson, 1915—1923
 Edgar Graham, 1923—1931
 Roy Wallace, 1931—1937
 John Britton, 1937—1938
 Marshall Priest, 1938—1939
 Robert Lowe, 1939—1945
 Jared Maddux, 1945
 Sam Carson, 1945—1946
 Jared Maddux, 1946—1949
 Cedric Hunt, 1949—1953
 Jeanne Bodfish, 1953—1955
 William Snodgrass, 1955—1999
 John Morgan, 1999—2009
 Justin Wilson, 2009—2021
 Jason Mumpower, 2021—present

References 

 
State agencies of Tennessee
1836 establishments in the United States
Tennessee